The Librarians is an Australian television comedy series which premiered on 31 October 2007 on ABC TV.  In the Republic of Ireland, the show aired on RTÉ Two. The series is produced and written by Robyn Butler and Wayne Hope who are also the principal cast members.  Hope is also the series' director.  The first series comprised six half-hour episodes.  The second series with another six episodes began airing on 5 August 2009 and was filmed at the Royal Melbourne Showgrounds.

The series centres on the trials and tribulations of Frances O'Brien, a devoutly Catholic and blithely racist Head Librarian.  Her life unravels when she is forced to employ her ex-best friend, Christine Grimwood – now a drug dealer – as the Children's Librarian.  Frances must do all she can to contain her menacing past and concentrate on the biggest event of the library calendar – Book Week.

Filming on a third and final series took place in early 2010 and aired on ABC1 later that year.
The theme music for The Librarians is an upbeat variation on the popular jazz tune "A Night in Tunisia" by Dizzy Gillespie.

The Librarians was rated M in New Zealand for offensive language, sexual references and drug use.

Episodes

Season 1: 2007

Season 2: 2009

Season 3: 2010

Cast

Main cast
 Robyn Butler as Frances O'Brien
 Roz Hammond as Christine Grimwood
 Heidi Arena as Dawn McConnichie
 Stephen Ballantyne as Matthew Bytnskov
 Keith Brockett as Ky Lee
 Bob Franklin as Neil Slider
 Wayne Hope as Terry O'Brien
 Nicole Nabout as Nada al Farouk
 Kim Gyngell as Father Harris
 Josh Lawson as Lachie Davis (Series 1)
 Fiona Harris as Jane (Series 2 and 3)
 Victoria Eagger as Pearl O'Leary (Series 3)

Guests
 Grant Piro as Piero (Series 1)
 Stephen Curry as Life Coach (Series 1)
 Kate Kendall as Jacinta McSweeney (Series 1)
 Greg Stone as Premier Carter (Series 1)
 Molly Daniels as Bridget / Bernadette   (Series 1 and 2)
 Noni Hazelhurst as Midwife (Series 2)
 Marty Sheargold as Paolo (Series 2 and 3)
 Hamish Blake as HD News Journalist, Jake Jackson (Series 2)
 Vince Colosimo as Adrian Green, Head of the Australian Library Association (Series 2)
 Tony Martin as Gene, Adrian Green's boyfriend (Series 2)
 Angus Sampson as Xavier Fisher (Series 3)
 Tony Moclair as Bingo (Series 3)
 Justin Hamilton as Biscuit (Series 3)
 Lachy Hulme as Hasan, Nada's ex-husband (Series 3)
 Peter Garrett as himself (Series 3)
 Hannah Gadsby as Carmel (Series 2 and 3)
 Celia Pacquola as Indigo (Series 3)
 Patrick Brammall as Stuart (Series 3)
 Amanda Muggleton as Rose (Series 3)

Awards and nominations

Series 1 DVD & Blu-ray release

Series 2 DVD & Blu-ray release

See also
 List of Australian television series
 List of Australian Broadcasting Corporation programs

References

External links
 ABC TV – The Librarians
 
 Lallo, Michael: Fun between the covers, The Age
 Media Release
 TV Week
The Librarians - Episode 1 at Australian Screen Online

2007 Australian television series debuts
2010 Australian television series endings
Australian television sitcoms
Australian Broadcasting Corporation original programming
Television shows set in Melbourne
Dyslexia in fiction
Works set in libraries